Sector 6 is an administrative unit of Bucharest.

Quarters

 Crângași
 Drumul Taberei
 Ghencea
 Giulești
 Militari
 Regie

Politics 

Ciprian Ciucu, a national liberal (i.e. PNL member), is currently the sector's mayor, having been elected for a four-year term in 2020. The Local Council of Sector 6 has 27 seats, with the following party composition (as of 2020):

External links

Sectors of Bucharest